Stewart Charles Reginald Parvin  (born September 1966) is a British fashion designer, best known for his couture gowns.

Early life and education 
Stewart Parvin was born in September 1966, in Wokingham, Berkshire, to Dennis and Juliana V. Parvin nee Barker. He has a sister Amelia born 1971. He studied fashion at the Edinburgh College of Art.

Career 
Parvin worked for the couturier Donald Campbell, before starting his own Stewart Parvin label in 1995.

Parvin has been designing clothes for Queen Elizabeth II since 2007, and in March 2016, the Queen presented him with the Royal Victorian Order (RVO) whilst wearing a Parvin purple patterned day dress, specially designed for the occasion.

Parvin designed Zara Tindall's ivory silk bridal gown for her 2011 wedding.

In January 2018, Parvin was the bookmakers' favourite to design Meghan Markle's dress for her wedding to Prince Harry on 19 May 2018.

Philanthropy 
In response to COVID 19, Parvin designed and donated scrubs to NHS workers, Frimley Park Hospital being the first receiver. According to Parvin, Anita at Classic Textiles donated the fabric required for production of the dresses and some of his workers volunteered for the cause.

References

1966 births
Living people
British fashion designers
Alumni of the Edinburgh College of Art
People from Wokingham
Members of the Royal Victorian Order